The Montevideo Metropolitan Cathedral is the main Roman Catholic church of Montevideo, and seat of its archdiocese. It is located right in front of the Cabildo across Constitution Square, in the neighbourhood of  Ciudad Vieja.

History
The origin of the church dates from Spanish colonial times (1740), when a church constructed of brick was built on the site. In 1790, the foundation was laid for the construction of the current neoclassical structure. The church was consecrated in 1804; it is dedicated to the Immaculate Conception and to the patron saints of Montevideo, Philip and James.

There is one major altar, several side altars, memorials, and tombs of several of the former archbishops and bishops who served in the cathedral. On a side altar is venerated an image of the Virgin of the Thirty-Three, patron saint of Uruguay.

Gallery

See also
 List of Roman Catholic cathedrals in Uruguay
 Roman Catholic Archdiocese of Montevideo

References

Roman Catholic church buildings in Montevideo
Roman Catholic cathedrals in Uruguay
Ciudad Vieja, Montevideo
1804 establishments in Uruguay
Roman Catholic churches completed in 1804
19th-century Roman Catholic church buildings in Uruguay
Neoclassical church buildings in Uruguay